Austroharpa is a genus of sea snails, marine gastropod mollusks in the family Harpidae.

Species
Species within the genus Austroharpa include:
 Austroharpa exquisita (Iredale, 1931)
 Austroharpa learorum Hart & Limpus, 1998
 Austroharpa loisae Rehder, 1973
 † Austroharpa pulligera (Tate, 1889)
 Austroharpa punctata (Verco, 1896)
 † Austroharpa tatei Finlay, 1931
 Austroharpa wilsoni Rehder, 1973

References